Governor Cook or Cooke may refer to:

Henry D. Cooke (1825–1881), territorial governor of the District of Columbia
Howard Cooke (1915–2014), Governor-General of Jamaica
Humphrey Cooke, Governor of Bombay from 1665 1666
John Cook (governor) (1730–1789), President of Delaware
Lorrin A. Cooke (1831–1902), Governor of Connecticut
Nicholas Cooke (1717–1782), governor of the Colony of Rhode Island and Providence Plantations